Sami Allagui (born 28 May 1986) is a former professional footballer who played as a striker. He spent most of his career in Germany. At international level, he represented the Tunisia national team.

Club career
Allagui was awarded a three-year youth contract with R.S.C. Anderlecht in summer 2005.

On 11 May 2016, Allagui extended his contract at Hertha BSC until 2017.

Allagui joined 2. Bundesliga side FC St. Pauli when his contract with Hertha BSC expired in summer of 2017.

Allagui announced his retirement in October 2020 citing injury problems.

International career
On 10 November 2008, Allagui was called up to play for the Tunisia national team and played 45 minutes. In a May 2009 friendly match against Sudan, he scored his first international goal. He scored again against Oman on 29 March 2011. On 10 August 2011, Allagui scored a double in a friendly match against Mali.

Career statistics

Club

References

External links
  
 

1986 births
Living people
Footballers from Düsseldorf
Association football forwards
2012 Africa Cup of Nations players
Tunisian footballers
Tunisia international footballers
Citizens of Tunisia through descent
German footballers
German people of Tunisian descent
German sportspeople of African descent
Belgian Pro League players
Bundesliga players
2. Bundesliga players
R.S.C. Anderlecht players
K.S.V. Roeselare players
FC Carl Zeiss Jena players
1. FSV Mainz 05 players
SpVgg Greuther Fürth players
Hertha BSC players
FC St. Pauli players
Royal Excel Mouscron players
Tunisian expatriate footballers
Tunisian expatriate sportspeople in Belgium
Expatriate footballers in Belgium
Tunisian expatriate sportspeople in Germany
Expatriate footballers in Germany